Zdeněk Lihnart (born 5 March 1994) is a professional Czech football player currently playing for FC MAS Táborsko in the Czech First League, on loan from SK Slavia Prague.

Linhart started his football career at local club SK Čtyři Dvory before joining České Budějovice. He made his professional league debut in a 1–3 away loss against Mladá Boleslav on 27 November 2011. He was a frequent late substitute throughout the 2012–13 season, scoring his first league goal in a 2–3 away loss against Viktoria Plzeň.

He signed for Slavia Prague in December 2015 and was immediately sent on loan, first to Táborsko in the Czech National Football League (2nd tier) and then to Bohemians 1905 in the Czech First League. However, early into his Bohemians spell he suffered a knee injury and didn't appear in any league matches for the club.

References

External links 
 Zdeněk Linhart official international statistics
 
 

Czech footballers
Czech Republic youth international footballers
Czech Republic under-21 international footballers
1994 births
Living people
Czech First League players
SK Dynamo České Budějovice players
Association football forwards
Sportspeople from České Budějovice